Kedahan Malays (Malay: Melayu Kedah, Jawi: ملايو ﻗﺪﺡ) or commonly known as Orang Utara ('Northerners'), is a sub-group of Malays who are native to northern Malaysia (in the states Kedah, Penang and Perlis as well northernmost parts of Perak) and in southernmost parts of Thailand (in the provinces of Phuket, Trang and Satun) and Burma (in Mergui Archipelago). They are among the earliest settlers in the Malay peninsula. Kedahan Malays comprised at least 15% of the total Malaysian Malay population and constitute over 75% of the Kedah state population, thus making them the largest ethnic group in the state of Kedah.

History

According to history, Kedah was very popular among Arabian traders. Thus, this has led to interracial marriages between Arabs and Malays. Due to Arabic influences in the Kedahan Malay language, some Kedahan Malay are of Arab descent. However some of the Kedahan Malays that resided on the island-state of Penang might have Indian and/or Chinese blood and some who lived in Thailand might have Thai blood.

Kedah Valley
Kedah Valley is an area where the majority inhabitants are Kedahan Malays. The valley covered the Satun province of Thailand and the three northern states of Malaysia (Perlis, Kedah, Pulau Pinang) with at least an area of 25,908 km square.

Demonym
Nowadays, most Kedahan Malays known themselves as Orang Utara or "People of the Northern Region" instead of Kedahan Malay since that they resided the northern part of Peninsular Malaysia. So are their language, which is called Pelat Utara or Northern Dialect.

Language

The Kedahan Malays have their own unique variety of Malay known as Kedah Malay or Pelat Utagha (northern dialect) as known by its native speakers. It is related to other varieties of Malay spoken in the peninsula but has its own unique pronunciation and also vocabulary. Kedahan Malay language can be divided into several sub-dialects, namely Kedah Persisiran (coastal dialect; standard) or Kedah Hulu (interior), Kedah Utara (northern Kedah), Perlis-Langkawi, Penang and some others (sub-dialects spoken in Satun and Southern Myanmar). For instance instead of using kamu to denote as 'you', hang (English pronunciation: hung) is used instead and cek for 'i/me' instead of saya / aku in other Malay varieties in the peninsula. Besides proper Kedah Malay, another variety of Malay spoken is Baling Malay, which is distinct from Kedah Malay and more closely related to varieties of Malay spoken in Southern Thailand and East Coast of Peninsular Malaysia. Kedah Malay is considered distinct enough to have its own ISO code that is meo.

Customs and culture

Kedahan Malay shares the same customs and traditions with other Malay in Peninsular Malaysia. The only thing that make them different is just their spoken dialect. Many aspects of Kedahan Malay culture includes:

Cuisine

Nasi Daging Air Asam
Kuih Dangai
Kuih Peneram
Pek Nga
Karas
Pulut Mangga
Pulut Durian
Nasi Lemuni
Kuih Bunga Pundak

Dance theater
 Mek Mulung
 Mak Yong Kedah
 Jikey
 Boria (theatre): The most famous Kedahan culture of Indian origin. It is quite similar to a musical theater. The theater used a fully Kedahan Malay language while the song used a mix of standard Malay and Kedahan accent or sometimes, a fully standard Malay. This theater is said to be created after the hybrid of Malay and Indian culture in Penang.
 Inai dance
 Canggung dance: A dance originating from Perlis but also very popular in Kedah and Penang

Art theater
 Wayang Kulit Gedek

Customs
 Berendul (pronunciation: be-ghen-doi): A group of men would sing traditional Kedahan folk songs to a newborn baby in celebration of birth of the child.

Poetry
 Ghazal Kedah

Martial arts
 Silat Kuntau Tekpi: A Silat Melayu style that was founded by Panglima Taib bin Wan Hussain who was a Panglima (Palace Warrior-General) of the empire of Kedah. It is also a 'sister-art' of silat styles that stemmed from Panglima Tok Rashid, including Silat Kalimah and Silat Cekak.
 Silat Cekak: A Silat Melayu style that was founded by Ustaz Hanafi, a Kedahan Malay but is now popular throughout Malaysia and to some extent in Indonesia as well.

In popular culture

Films
 Raja Bersiong
 Rempit V3
 Hikayat Merong Mahawangsa
 Cun (2011)

Television series
 Cinta Anak Kedah
 Makbul
 Dari Kodiang ke Kolumpo.
 Mak Cun
 Kak Marr

Notable Kedahan Malay
 Abdul Rahman Abbas, Yang di-Pertua Negeri of Penang from 2001 to 2021
 Abdul Hamid Omar, last Lord President of the Supreme Court from 1989 to 1992 and Chief Justice of Malaysia from 1989 to 1994
 Abdullah Ahmad Badawi, 5th Prime Minister of Malaysia from 2003 to 2009 (Kedahan Malay of Chinese and Arab descent)
 Ahmad Bashah Md Hanipah, former Deputy Minister of Domestic Trade and Consumer Affairs, Chief Minister of Kedah from 2016 to 2018
 Anwar Ibrahim, current 10th Prime Minister of Malaysia
 Askora Asbar, Malaysian and International Ping Pong star
 Azizan Abdul Razak, Chief Minister of Kedah from 2008 to 2013
 Azmi Khalid, former Deputy Minister of Natural Resources and Environment
 Surin Pitsuwan, 12th Secretary General of the Association of Southeast Asian Nations (ASEAN), Thailand Minister of Foreign Affairs from 1997 to 2001
 Farid Kamil, Malaysian actor
 Bront Palarae, Malaysian actor, screenwriter, director and producer
 Janna Nick, Malaysian actress and singer (Kedahan Malay with Chinese, Thai and Indo/Pakistani descent)
 Ahmad Fairuz Abdul Halim, Chief Justice of Malaysia from 2003 to 2006
 Hani Mohsin, Malaysian actor and TV host
 Johari Abdul, Malaysian Government Backbencher Leader from 2018 to 2020
 Mohamed Dzaiddin Abdullah, Chief Justice of Malaysia from 2000 to 2003
 House of Jamalullail (Perlis), the ruling royal family of the state of Perlis (Kedahan Malay with Arab descent)
 Mahathir Mohamad, Malaysian 4th and 7th Prime Minister from 1981 to 2003 and from 2018 to 2020 (Kedahan Malay with Indian descent)
 Mahdzir Khalid, former Minister of Education, Chief Minister of Kedah from 2005 to 2008
 Zaki Azmi, Chief Justice of Malaysia from 2008 to 2011
 Mazlan Ahmad, famous Malaysian comedian
 Mohamed Azmi Mohamed, Lord President of the Supreme Court from 1968 to 1974
 Muhammad Sanusi Md Nor, current Chief Minister of Kedah
 Mukhriz Mahathir, former Deputy Minister of International Trade and Industry (MITI), Chief Minister of Kedah from 2013 to 2016 and from 2018 to 2020
 Osman Aroff, Chief Minister of Kedah from 1985 to 1996
 P. Ramlee, Malay film actor (Kedahan Malay maternal ancestry, Acehnese father)
 Rozita Che Wan, Malaysian actress and personality
 Sanusi Junid, former Minister of Agriculture, Chief Minister of Kedah from 1996 to 1999
 Sharifah Rodziah Syed Alwi Barakbah, Spouse of the 1st Prime Minister of Malaysia
 Syed Ahmad Syed Mahmud Shahabuddin, Chief Minister of Kedah from 1967 to 1978 and Yang di-Pertua Negeri of Malacca from 1984 to 2004 
 Syed Mokhtar Al-Bukhary, the 7th richest corporate figure in Malaysia (Kedahan Malay with Arab descent)
 Syed Razak Syed Zain Barakbah, Chief Minister of Kedah from 1999 to 2005
 Syed Sheh Hassan Barakbah, Lord President of the Supreme Court from 1966 to 1968, 3rd Yang di-Pertua Negeri of Penang from 1969 to 1975 and President of the Dewan Negara from 1959 to 1969
 Syed Sheh Shahabudin, 2nd Yang di-Pertua Negeri of Penang
 Tunku Abdul Rahman, 1st Prime Minister of Malaysia, also regarded as "Father of Independence" and member of the Kedah royal family (Kedahan Malay with Thai descent)
 Zulkifli Ismail, Malaysian actor
 Abdul Hamid Mohamad, Chief Justice of Malaysia from 2006 to 2008
 Zulkiflee Anwar Haque, a political cartoonist famously known as Zunar and a 2016 Cartooning for Peace Prize winner.
 Akhyar Rashid, Malaysian footballer
 Faiz Subri , Penerima Anugerah Puskas award 2016

See also
 Kedah Wayang kulit Seri ansun
 Malays (ethnic group), the ethnic group located primarily in the Malay peninsula, and parts of Sumatra and Borneo
 Malay race, a racial category encompassing the people of South East Asia and sometimes the Pacific Islands
 Malaysian Malays, a constitutionally defined group of Muslim Malaysian citizens
 Malay Singaporeans
 Malay Indonesians, ethnic Malays in Indonesia
 Thai Malays, ethnic Malays in Thailand
 Sri Lankan Malays, an ethnic group in Sri Lanka of Indonesian ancestry
 Cape Malays, an ethnic group or community in South Africa
 Cocos Malays, the predominant group ethnic group of the Cocos (Keeling) Islands, now part of Australia
 Overseas Malays, people of Malay ancestry living outside Malaysia and neighbouring ethnic Malay home areas
 Burmese Malays

References

Further reading
 Asmah Haji Omar (2008). Susur Galur Bahasa Melayu. Kuala Lumpur: Dewan Bahasa dan Pustaka (DBP).
 Dato’ James F. Augustin (1996) Bygone Kedah. Alor Setar: Lembaga Muzium Negeri Kedah Darul Aman 
 Intisari Kebudayaan Melayu Kedah (1986). Alor Setar: Majlis Kebudayaan Negeri Kedah.

Ethnic groups in Malaysia
Sub-ethnic groups
Malay people
Kedah society